Aracruz may refer to:

 Aracruz Celulose, a Brazilian manufacturer of pulp and paper
 Aracruz, Espírito Santo, a municipality in the state of Espírito Santo, Brazil